PA1 or PA-1 may refer to:
 Pad Abort Test 1, a 1963 Apollo test flight
 Pad Abort 1 (Orion), a 2010 Orion test flight
 
 Pennsylvania state route 1, a former state highway near Philadelphia
 U.S. Route 1 in Pennsylvania
 Muhammed Akbar Khan, Pakistan Army general
 ALCO PA, train locomotive
 The PA1, a type of rolling stock used on the PATH train in New York and New Jersey
 PA-1 (cell line), a human ovarian cancer cell line
 PA1 key, on the IBM 3270 keyboard